Peter Pieters (born 2 February 1962) is a retired Dutch cyclist who was active between 1980 and 1998. On track, he competed at the 1996 Summer Olympics in the individual 4 km pursuit and points race,  and won a bronze medal in the points race at the 1991 world championships. On the road, he won the Delta Profronde (1988), Paris–Tours (1988), Profronde van Almelo (1990) and Ronde van de Haarlemmermeer (1996), as well as individual stages of the Olympia's Tour (1983), Vuelta a Burgos (1984), Driedaagse van West-Vlaanderen (1984), Vuelta a Murcia (1985), Tour of Belgium (1988) and Tour of Sweden (1992). After retiring from competition he worked as a cycling coach, in particular he was successful with the Belgian national team: in 2017 the Belgium national team brought home the highest number of medals in 50 years.

Pieters's brother Sjaak and daughter Amy are also Olympic cyclists.

See also
 List of Dutch Olympic cyclists

References

1962 births
Living people
Olympic cyclists of the Netherlands
Cyclists at the 1996 Summer Olympics
Dutch male cyclists
People from Haarlemmermeer
Cyclists from North Holland